The Texas State Police (TSP) was created following the Civil War by order of Texas Governor Edmund J. Davis. The TSP worked primarily against racially based crimes in Texas, and included black police officers. It was replaced by a renewed Texas Rangers force in 1873.

History
The Texas State Police was formed during the administration of Governor Davis on July 22, 1870, to combat crime during the Reconstruction Era of the United States. Davis also created the State Guard of Texas, and the Texas Reserve Militia, which were forerunners of the Texas National Guard.

Among Texas State Police members were Captain Jack Helm of DeWitt County, Texas—later murdered by John Wesley Hardin and Jim Taylor during the Sutton–Taylor feud.  Another notable member was Leander H. McNelly of the Texas Ranger's "Special Force" division.

Mixed results
Despite the success of the Texas State Police, the fact that the organization was controlled by Governor Davis and employed African Americans made it very unpopular, especially with former slave owners.

Flawed
In September 1870, local citizens of Hill County, Texas refused to cooperate with the TSP in moving against the Kinch West gang; and in December 1870 Hill County citizens blocked the TSP from arresting the killers of a freedmen couple.

Some state police members certainly deserved criticism. Captain Helm, for instance, was accused of murdering prisoners; he was fired, and a warrant was issued for his arrest. Others committed crimes for which the charges were dropped as soon as headquarters was advised. James Davidson, the chief of the state police, embezzled $37,435 and disappeared in 1872.

Disbanded
On April 22, 1873, the law authorizing the state police was repealed. Former policeman Leander H. McNelly and at least thirty-six other state police members then became officers in the reincarnated Texas Rangers force.

Fallen officers
Of nine members of the TSP known to have been killed in the line of duty, privates Jim Smalley was  killed in 1871, also by Hardin. Four other members died as a result of a shootout on March 14, 1873.

Legacy
The Texas State Police was abolished in 1873.  In 1935, the Texas Department of Public Safety was formed to serve as one of the several state police forces (the TDPS predecessor was the Texas Ranger Division formed by the Texas Legislature as McNelly's "Special Force of Rangers" and the "Frontier Battalion" in July 1874).

Other state agencies, including the Texas Attorney General's Office, Texas Parks and Wildlife Department, and the Texas Alcoholic Beverage Commission identify as state police yet provide state police services within their areas of responsibility, and informally use the term "State Police" on their uniforms and insignia.

See also

 Texas Special Police
 List of law enforcement agencies in Texas

References

Bibliography 
 Ann Patton Baenziger, "The Texas State Police during Reconstruction: A Reexamination," Southwestern Historical Quarterly 72 (April 1969). 
 William T. Field, Jr., "The Texas State Police, 1870–1873," Texas Military History 5 (Fall 1965).

External links

Defunct law enforcement agencies of Texas
History of Texas
1870 establishments in Texas